The University for Development Studies, Tamale was established in 1992 by the government of Ghana with a view to accelerating the development of the then 3 Northern Regions of Ghana (the Northern, Upper East and Upper West Regions). The late President Jerry John Rawlings played a crucial role in its founding as he used his prize money from World Food Prize of $50,000 as seed money for its founding. It was set up as a multi-campus institution. It is the fifth public university to be established in Ghana. This deviates from the usual practice of having universities with central campuses and administrations. It was created with the three northern regions of North Ghana in mind. These are the Northern Region, Upper East Region and the Upper West Region. It has four campuses in all, eight Faculties, a Business School, one Medical School, one Graduate School, one Institute and three centres.

Faculties

Faculty of Planning and Land Management
Department of Community Development
Department of Planning and Management
Department of Real Estate and Land management

Faculty of Agriculture
Department of Agricultural Mechanization and Irrigation Technology
Department of Agricultural Extension and Farm Management
Department of Agronomy
Department of Animal Science
Department of Biotechnology
Department of Consumer Sciences & Agricultural Education 
Department of Horticulture

Faculty of Natural Resources and Environment 

Department of Forestry and Forest Resources Management
Department of Fisheries ad Aquatic Resources Management
Department of Biodiversity Conservation and Management
Department of Environment and Sustainability
Department of Ecotourism and Resort Management

School of Allied Health Sciences

The following Programmes are offered

 Undergraduate
 4-Year BSc (Community Nutrition)
 4-Year BSc (Nursing)
 4-Year BSc (Midwifery)
 2/3-Year BSc (Nursing)
 2-Year BSc (Midwifery)
 3-Year BSc (Nurse Practitioner)
 6-Year Doctor of Medical Laboratory Sciences (MLS.D)  Sandwich Post-Graduate
 MSc./MPhil in Community Health and Development (Modular)
 MSc./MPhil in Public Health Nutrition (Modular)

Faculty of Applied Sciences
Department of Applied Biology
Department of Applied Chemistry & Biochemistry
Department of Applied Physics

Faculty of Mathematical Sciences
Department of Mathematics
Department of Computer Science
Department of Statistics

Faculty of Earth and Environmental Sciences

Department of Earth and Geological Sciences
Department of Environmental Science

Faculty of Integrated Development
Department of Economics & Entrepreneurship Development
Department of Environmental & Resource Studies
Department of Social, Political & Historical Studies
Department of Planning, Land Economy and Rural Development
Department of Communication studies
Department of Business Studies

School of Medicine and Health Sciences

The first batch of students were admitted in 1997
Department of Biochemistry & Molecular Medicine
Department of Community Nutrition
Department of Microbiology
Department of Pharmacology
Department of Community Health and Family Medicine
Department of Physiology & Surgery

Faculty of Education
Department of Development Education Studies
Department of Basic Education Studies
Department of Educational Foundation Studies
Department of social and Business Studies

Faculty of Horticulture
To be established at the University for Development Studies

Directorates 

 Directorate of Finance
 Directorate of Academic Planning and Quality Assurance
 Directorate of International Relations and Advancement
 Directorate of Estates
 Directorate of ICT
 Directorate of Internal Audit
 Directorate of Works and Physical Development
 Directorate of Community Relations and Outreach Programmes (DCROP)
 Directorate of Procurement
 Directorate of Health Services
 Directorate of Sports
 Directorate of Colleges of Education Affiliation

Campuses
Nyankpala, Northern Region, Ghana – houses the Faculty of Agriculture, Faculty of Renewable Natural Resources, Faculty of Agribusiness and Communication Sciences and the School of Engineering.
Navrongo, Upper East Region – location of the campus which houses the Faculty of Applied Science and Faculty of Mathematical Sciences
Tamale, Northern Region, Ghana – houses the School of Medicine and Health Sciences, School of Allied Health Sciences and The Faculty of Education
Wa, Upper West Region – houses the Faculty of Integrated Development Studies, School of Business and Law and the Faculty of Planning and Land Management

Third trimester field practical programme
For the Third Trimester Practical Programme (TTFPP) the whole of the third trimester is devoted to practical field work in the local communities. Students of a given year group identify a specific region, and in smaller groups live and interact with the people in the local communities during each third trimester for a period of three years. The programme began in 1993. It entails the combination of students from all the faculties: Agriculture, Integrated Development Studies; Applied Science and the School of Medicine and Health Sciences.

List of vice chancellors
Prof. R.B Bening Pioneer Vice Chancellor (1992 – 2001)
Prof G.W.K Mensah (Acting Vice Chancellor) (2001 – 2002)
Prof. John Bonaventure Kubongpwa Kaburise (April 8, 2002 – April 7, 2007)
Prof. Nokoe (Acting Vice Chancellor) (April 2007 – 30 June 2010)
Prof. Haruna Yakubu (June 1, 2010 – 2015)
Prof. Gabriel Ayum Teye (October 1, 2015 – Present)

See also 
 List of universities in Ghana

References

Sources
Universities of Ghana Overseas Office
Ghanaweb.com
 Official UDS website

 
Educational institutions established in 1992
Tamale, Ghana
Dagbon
1992 establishments in Ghana
Universities in Ghana